The Amazing Transparent Man is a 1960 American science fiction thriller B-movie starring Marguerite Chapman in her final feature film. The plot follows an insane ex–U.S. Army major who uses an escaped criminal to steal materials to improve the invisibility machine his scientist prisoner made. It was one of two sci-fi films shot back-to-back in Dallas, Texas by director Edgar G. Ulmer (the other was Beyond the Time Barrier, also released that same year). The combined filming schedule for both films was only two weeks. The film was later featured in an episode of Mystery Science Theater 3000.

Plot
Former U.S. Army major Paul Krenner plans to conquer the world with an army of invisible soldiers and will do anything to achieve that goal. With the help of his hired muscle Julian, Krenner forces Dr. Peter Ulof to perfect the invisibility machine that Ulof invented. He imprisons Ulof's daughter Maria to keep Ulof in line.

The nuclear materials that Ulof needs to improve his invisibility machine are extremely rare and kept under guard in government facilities. Krenner arranges the prison break of notorious safecracker Joey Faust to steal the materials that he needs. Faust will do the jobs while invisible. Krenner offers Faust money for the jobs and Faust expresses his grievances against working for him. Faust tells him that he will snitch if he is returned to prison, but Krenner informs Faust that he is wanted dead or alive, so Faust reluctantly complies. However, when he meets Krenner's woman, Laura Matson, he slowly charms her into a double cross.

Faust continues attempting to escape and tries to get one over on Krenner. It looks as if he may have the edge on Krenner when Faust attacks Krenner while invisible. However, Dr. Ulof's guinea pig dies and, during the second time that he is invisible, Faust uncontrollably reverts from invisible to visible and back again. Despite these drawbacks, Faust forges ahead, intent on breaking free from Krenner's control.

Dr. Ulof reveals to Faust that both of them are dying from radiation poisoning as a side effect of the invisibility machine. He then convinces Faust to stop Krenner. Faust and Krenner fight in the lab until an accidental nuclear explosion kills them both and puts an end to Krenner's plans for world conquest.

Cast

Production and release
The film was produced by Miller-Consolidated Pictures, which provided it a brief release in 1960. After the bankruptcy of Miller-Consolidated, The Amazing Transparent Man and Beyond the Time Barrier were picked up by American International Pictures for the lab costs and released again later in the year as a double feature.

Mystery Science Theater 3000
The Amazing Transparent Man was featured in episode #623 of Mystery Science Theater 3000 along with The Days of Our Years, a workplace safety short film. The episode debuted March 18, 1995 on Comedy Central. The episode did not make the Top 100 list of episodes as voted upon by MST3K Season 11 Kickstarter backers. Writer Jim Vorel concurred with the fans' opinion, ranking the episode #140 (out of 191 total MST3K episodes). Vorel calls The Amazing Transparent Man "instantly forgettable" and claims that the short "completely steals the show".

The MST3K version of The Amazing Transparent Man was included as part of the Mystery Science Theater 3000, Volume XXXIX DVD collection released by Shout! Factory on November 21, 2017. The other episodes in the four-disc set include Girls Town (episode #601) and Diabolik (episode #1013). The fourth disc, titled "Satellite Dishes," collects non-movie segments from MST3K episodes that are unlikely to be collected on DVD.

References

External links

 
 
 Online Trailer at Internet Archive
 The Amazing Transparent Man at Google Videos
 

1960 films
1960s English-language films
1960s science fiction films
American independent films
American black-and-white films
American International Pictures films
Films shot in Dallas
Films about invisibility
Films directed by Edgar G. Ulmer
Films based on The Invisible Man
1960s American films